The Queen's Gaels football team represents Queen's University in the sport of Canadian football. The Gaels compete at the U Sports football level, within the Ontario University Athletics (OUA) conference. Queen's began competing in intercollegiate football in 1882. The Gaels play in the Richardson Memorial Stadium in Kingston, which has a capacity of 8,000. 

Since its inception, the team has won 23 Yates Cup championships and four Vanier Cup championships, the most recent being in 2009. 

Unique to only two Canadian universities (the other being University of Toronto Varsity Blues) Queen's has also competed and won three Grey Cup championships (1922, 1923, 1924).

The program has had three Hec Crighton Trophy winners, Larry Mohr and Tommy Denison who won it twice.

History
Queen's has competed continuously since 1882 and the team began organized play in 1883 when the Ontario Rugby Football Union (ORFU) was first founded. The team later went on to win two ORFU championships in 1893 and 1894. 

The first organized university football league in Canada, the Canadian Intercollegiate Rugby Football Union (CIRFU), was founded in Kingston in November 1897, with charter members Queen's, McGill University, and the University of Toronto. 

Queen's exerted its dominance in the 1920s, winning three straight Grey Cups in 1922, 1923 and 1924. In 1955, the Grey Cup ceased being awarded to amateur teams. Since the beginning of the Vanier Cup championship in 1965, Queen's has won four titles in 1968, 1978, 1992 and 2009.

Steve Snyder era (2019-Present) 
Steve Snyder took over the team in 2019. In 2021, he led the team to a perfect season in the OUA and a berth into the Yates Cup Final. Steve was named OUA and U SPORTS Coach of the Year in 2021.

Pat Sheahan era (2000-2018) 
The team was led by head coach Pat Sheahan from 2000 to 2018, and he led them to their fourth Vanier Cup in 2009. The following year the team endured a difficult 2010 season, finishing 3-5. The team went on to have strong seasons in 2011 and 2012 when the team finished 6-2 and in third place in both years. The Gaels qualified for the playoffs for eight straight years until they finally missed the playoffs in 2014. The team finished fourth in the OUA in 2015, being beaten by the Carleton Ravens in the semi-final game. The team finished in seventh place in 2016 with a 3-5 record and missed the playoffs due to a tie-breaker with Guelph, whom they lost to earlier in the season. In 2019, Sheahan was replaced by the team's current head coach, Steve Snyder.

Head coaches 
List of Queen's Gaels head coaches.

 Frank Tindall (1939,1948–1975)
 Doug Hargreaves (1976–1994)
 Bob Howes (1995–1999)
 Pat Sheahan (2000–2018)
 Steve Snyder (2019–present)

Season-by-season record
The following is the record of the Queen's Gaels football team since 1992:

National award winners
Hec Crighton Trophy: Larry Mohr (1985), Tommy Denison (2002, 2003)
J. P. Metras Trophy: Dick Bakker (1977), Jim Muller (1979), Mike Schad (1985)
Presidents' Trophy: Thaine Carter (2008)
Peter Gorman Trophy: Gord Goodwin (1977)
Russ Jackson Award: Charlie Galunic (1986), Jock Climie (1989), Curt McLellan (2003), Curtis Carmichael (2015)
Frank Tindall Trophy: Doug Hargreaves (1983), Pat Sheahan (2008), Steve Snyder (2021)

Queen's Gaels in the CFL
As of the end of the 2022 CFL season, six former Gaels players are on CFL teams' rosters:
Peter Adjey, Edmonton Elks
Konner Burtenshaw, Winnipeg Blue Bombers
Anthony Federico, Hamilton Tiger-Cats
Cameron Lawson, Winnipeg Blue Bombers
Chris Osei-Kusi, Edmonton Elks
Derek Wiggan, Calgary Stampeders

Notable team alumni 
One notable Queen's player was Carl Voss, who was both an excellent football and hockey player. While attending university, he played four football seasons (1924–1927), which included the 12th Grey Cup in 1924. Voss has his name engraved on the Grey Cup for this season. Voss also scored the Stanley Cup winning goal for the Chicago Blackhawks in the 1938 Stanley Cup Finals. He was inducted into the Hockey Hall of Fame. Along with Lionel Conacher, Voss is one of only two players to have their name engraved on both the Stanley Cup and the Grey Cup.

Chris Patrician, player on the 2011-14 Queen's football teams, was named to Canada's 2022 Olympic team.

References

External links
 Official website

U Sports football teams
Sport in Kingston, Ontario
Golden Gaels
Queen's Golden Gaels football